The  Château de la Grange Fort or Château de la Grangefort is a 15th-century French castle located in the commune of  Les Pradeaux, near Issoire, in the Puy-de-Dôme département of France.

It dates from the 15th century but has been destroyed and rebuilt several times. In the 19th century, it was restored and embellished by Viollet-le-Duc. It was converted into a campsite and guest house by Van Bronkhorst, an aristocratic Dutch family originally from Hengelo (Gelderland), who bought the site in 1985.

Gallery

See also
List of castles in France

References

External links
 Ministry of Culture photos

Buildings and structures in Puy-de-Dôme
Castles in Auvergne-Rhône-Alpes